Morden is a district in the London Borough of Merton, England.

Morden may also refer to:

Places

Australia
 Parish of Morden, a civil parish in New South Wales

Canada
 Morden, Manitoba, a city in Manitoba
Morden (electoral district), a former electoral district centered on that city
 Morden, Nova Scotia, a town in Nova Scotia on the Bay of Fundy

United Kingdom
 Morden, Dorset, a village in England
 Morden tube station, in London, England
 Ashwell & Morden railway station, near Guilden and Steeple Morden in Cambridgeshire
 Guilden Morden, Cambridgeshire
 Steeple Morden, Cambridgeshire

People
 Morden (surname), people with the surname

Fictional characters
 Morden (Babylon 5), a fictional character on the television series Babylon 5
 General Morden, the main antagonist of the Metal Slug series of arcade games
 The Morden, an enemy race from the video game Dungeon Siege II

Entertainment
 "Morden", a song by Good Shoes

Other uses
 HMCS Morden, a Canadian Navy corvette in service during World War II
 14502 Morden, a minor planet
 Ulmus americana 'Morden', an elm cultivar

See also
 Mordon, a village in County Durham, England
 Todmorden, a town in West Yorkshire, England
 Morden station (disambiguation)